Scott Creek is a  long 1st order tributary to the Trent River in Jones County, North Carolina.

Course
Scott Creek rises at Jones Corner, North Carolina and then flows southeast to join the Trent River about 3 miles northeast of Pollocksville.

Watershed
Scott Creek drains  of area, receives about 54.0 in/year of precipitation, has a wetness index of 547.11, and is about 36% forested.

See also
List of rivers of North Carolina

References

Rivers of North Carolina
Rivers of Jones County, North Carolina